Kanchilda Baale is a Tulu Language Film directed and produced by Raghunath Rai Kumbra. Charithra Hedge from Udupi has acted in the title role Kanchilda Baale. A film showing conflict between superstitions and beliefs of people highlights the bhootharadhane (spirit worship) of the region.

Plot
Manu, a doctor who lives in the U.S., visits his mother along with his wife and daughter, in the ancestral house after several years. Ajjamma (Manu's mother) tells Manu that she had promised to perform the Kanchil ceremony if a girl was born to her son, but Manu dismisses it as a "blind belief". She made the promise as her son and daughter-in-law did not have a child even after more than four years of marriage. Manu said that he would not allow his daughter to participate in the ceremony as he and his wife had deferred having a baby because she was still pursuing her studies for some years after they got married. In many ways, the film is about negotiating between tradition and modernity, and faith and superstition, as well as the omnipresent caste. Manu's wife suggests that there is no harm in letting the ceremony as it would please the old woman. Manu remained adamant arguing that his daughter was not born because god willed it to happen.

Cast 
Charithra Hedge as Kanchilda Baale
Muthappa Rai
Shakunthala Shetty T
Naveen D Padil
Sai Krishna
Aravind Bolar
D N Bolar
Pradeepchandra
Manasi D S
Sudhirraj Kateel
Ravi Hosur 
Harini Karkala

List of Tulu Movies
List of tulu films of 2015
List of Tulu films of 2014
List of Released Tulu films
Tulu cinema

References

2011 films